Zumaia is a railway station in Zumaia, Basque Country, Spain. It is owned by Euskal Trenbide Sarea and operated by Euskotren. It lies on the Bilbao-San Sebastián line.

History 
The station opened in 1901 as part of the Zarautz-Deba stretch of the San Sebastián-Elgoibar railway. The line was extended to  two years later. The current station building dates from 1926. Originally, it served the Urola railway, with the Bilbao-San Sebastián tracks to the north of it. The Urola railway closed in 1986, and in 1997 the tracks of the Bilbao-San Sebastián line were moved to the position of the former Urola tracks.

Services 
The station is served by Euskotren Trena line E1. In the other direction (towards Matiko, Bilbao), trains run every hour throughout the week.

References

External links
 

Euskotren Trena stations
Railway stations in Gipuzkoa
Railway stations in Spain opened in 1901